Bergen is the name of some places in the U.S. state of Wisconsin:
Bergen, Marathon County, Wisconsin, a town
Bergen, Rock County, Wisconsin, an unincorporated community
Bergen, Vernon County, Wisconsin, a town